Canada participated at the 2017 Summer Universiade, in Taipei, Taiwan.

Competitors
The following table lists Canada's delegation per sport and gender.

Medal summary

Medal by sports

Athletics

Men

Track Events

Field Events

Combined Events

Decathlon

Women

Track Events

Field Events

Combined Events

Heptathlon

Badminton

Singles and doubles

Team

Basketball

Men's tournament

Group Stage

|}

9th–16th place game

9th–12th place game

9th place game

Women's tournament

Group Stage

|}

Quarterfinals

Diving

Fencing

Football

Men's tournament

Group Stage

9th–16th place match

9th–12th place match

9th place match

Women's tournament

Group Stage

Quarterfinals

5th–8th place match

7th place match

Golf

Gymnastics

Artistic

Men

Individual

Team

Women

Individual

Team

Rhythmic

Swimming

Men

Women

Table Tennis

Taekwondo

Volleyball

Men's tournament

Preliminary Round

|}

|}

9th–16th place quarterfinals

|}

9th–12th place semifinals

|}

11th place match

|}

Women's tournament

Preliminary Round

|}

|}

9th–16th place quarterfinals

|}

13th–16th place semifinals

|}

13th place match

|}

Water Polo

Men's tournament

Preliminary Round

Round of 16

9th–16th place quarterfinals

9th–12th place semifinals

9th place match

Women's tournament

Preliminary Round

Quarterfinals

5th–8th place semifinals

5th place match

Weightlifting

Wushu

References

External links
Universiade Taipei 2017 
Canada Overview

Nations at the 2017 Summer Universiade
Canada at the Summer Universiade
2017 in Canadian sports